Eliza Cone is a rock with an archway through it standing  west of Cape McNab on the south end of Buckle Island, in the Balleny Islands. It is located adjacent to Scott Cone, the two features appear to have been named after John Balleny's schooner, the Eliza Scott, in which he discovered the Balleny Islands in February 1839.

References 

Rock formations of Antarctica
Landforms of the Balleny Islands
Rock formations of New Zealand